Yinchuan Xihuayuan Airport was the former main airport of Yinchuan, Ningxia, China. It was built on orders of Ningxia governor Ma Hongkui in 1935 as a military airport with a gravel runway. The airport was closed from September 1949 to September 1958. In 1958, the airport was renovated to welcome the establishment of the Ningxia Hui Autonomous Region, of which Yinchuan became the capital. After the renovation, the Xihuayuan Airport had a gravel runway with a length of 1415 meters and a width of 40 meters. On 20 October 1958, a CAAC Il-14 passenger plane landed at the airport, marking the official resumption of flights at the airport.

In September 1986, the airport was expanded and became a 3C-class airport, being able to handle aircraft like the BAe 146 under 50 tons. The airport ceased operations in September 1997 due to the facilities being in need of upgrading and lack of expansion room. Its function was taken over by Yinchuan Hedong Airport.

The airport was the only airport in China serving a provincial capital that still had a gravel runway. At night, the runway was lit using lanterns, and during the rainy season the airport would often flood.

The airport terminal was preserved as a protected cultural heritage site by the Yinchuan Cultural Relics Department.

Airlines and Destinations 
The airport could not handle larger aircraft such as the Boeing 737 or the Airbus A320, so smaller aircraft are commonly used instead. It is usually flooded with stagnant water during rainy seasons and flights usually stopped temporarily due to the reason. It was instead closed after 62 years in service due to poor management and poor basic equipment and poor designs.

Accidents 
On July 23, 1993, China Northwest Airlines Flight 2119 crashed into a lake and broke apart while attempting its second takeoff from the airport. At least 59 of the 113 persons aboard the aircraft were killed.

References 

Defunct airports in China
Yinchuan
Airports in Ningxia